Waldo is a city in Alachua County, Florida, United States. According to the 2010 census the population was 1,015, up from 821 in 2000.

History

The first major U.S. federal highway in early territorial Florida, Bellamy Road, was constructed in the 1820s–1830s and passed through Waldo from around Lake Santa Fe to the east and on towards the Santa Fe River in the west, where it passed over the river on a natural land bridge at modern O'Leno State Park. In 1853, the Florida Legislature chartered the Florida Railroad to build a line from Fernandina to Tampa, Florida, with a branch running to Cedar Key. U.S. Senator David Levy Yulee, president and chief stockholder of the Florida Railroad, made the decision to build the Cedar Key branch first. The section up to Gainesville was completed by 1859, with the intersection of Bellamy Road and the Florida Railroad named Waldo Station, after Senator Yulee's friend Benjamin Waldo, a doctor and politician. In 1876, the railroad branch from Waldo to Ocala was completed.

Geography

Lake Alto is a freshwater lake east of Waldo.

Demographics

As of the 2010 United States Census, there were 1,015 people, 413 households, and 245 families residing in the city. Of the 489 housing units 413 were occupied for an occupancy rate of 84.5%. The racial makeup of the city was 70.2% White, 25.9% African American, 0.2% Native American, 0.3% Asian, 1.6% some other race, and 1.8% from two or more races. Hispanic or Latino people of any race made up 3.2% of the population.

Of the 413 households, 245 or 59.3% were families and 128 or 31.0% had children under the age of 18 living with them. 144 households were headed by married couples living together which made up 34.9%, 79 households or 19.1% had a female householder with no husband present, while 22 or 5.3% had a male householder with no wife present. Non-family households made up 40.7% or 168 households. The average household size was 2.45 while the average family size was 3.10.

In the city, the population was spread out, with 24.1% under age 18, 9.1% from 18 to 24, 24.4% from 25 to 44, 26.9% from 45 to 64, and 15.5% aged 65 and over. The median age was 38.4 years. 51.3% of the population was female while 48.7% of the population was male.

For the period 2007–2011, the estimated median annual income for a household in the city was $28,167, and the median income for a family was $36,375. Male full-time workers had a median income of $33,021 versus $30,597 for females. The per capita income for the city was $15,693. About 30.3% of families and 34.7% of the population were below the poverty line, including 42.2% of those under age 18 and 14.4% of those age 65 or over.

Education
Waldo is served by the School Board of Alachua County. Upon closure of Waldo Community School in 2016, elementary students are now zoned for Chester Shell Elementary in Hawthorne. Students in sixth through twelfth grade attend Hawthorne Middle/High School in nearby Hawthorne. The Alachua County Library District operates a branch library in the city.

Speed trap designation

In August 1995, the American Automobile Association (AAA) declared Waldo, and the neighboring city of Lawtey as "Speed Traps" and urged motorists to choose alternate routes instead of driving through the two cities.  On September 2, 2014, the Florida Department of Law Enforcement began an investigation of Waldo's ticketing following allegations of ticketing quotas, with one police chief having been suspended for a two-week period.  On October 1, 2014, the City Council voted 4–1 to disband the city's police department. The former chief of the disbanded Waldo Police Department was cleared of any wrongdoing after an investigation by the Florida Criminal Justice Standards & Training Commission  (CJSTC). In a letter to the Waldo City Manager, the CJSTC wrote, "The decision is based upon the finding that insufficient grounds exist under the guidelines of Chapter 943.1395, Florida Statutes, to pursue any disciplinary action by the commission." This event led to then Florida Governor Rick Scott to sign a bill (SB 264) which better defined the ban on ticket quotas. Waldo is somewhat unique in that unlike most other speed trap towns, "...the speed trap in Waldo, Florida, was brought down not by outside pressure but from the inside", as reported in May of 2022 by Reason magazine.

In August 2018, the AAA officially lifted the designation of "Speed Trap" for the city of Waldo.

See also

 Florida Railroad: a history of the railroad that originally held the plats which became the City of Waldo
 Hampton, Florida: a nearby town that was almost disincorporated in 2014, in part due to "speed trap" behavior.

References
Turner, Gregg. (2003). A Short History of Florida Railroads. Charleston, South Carolina: Arcadia Publishing.

External links

Waldo Branch Library

Cities in Alachua County, Florida
Gainesville metropolitan area, Florida
Cities in Florida